Thiele is a German-language surname.

Geographical distribution
As of 2014, 78.0% of all known bearers of the surname Thiele were residents of Germany, 10.9% of the United States, 2.3% of Australia, 2.0% of Brazil, 1.0% of Canada and 1.0% of South Africa.

In Germany, the frequency of the surname was higher than national average (1:1,741) in the following states:
 1. Brandenburg (1:477)
 2. Saxony-Anhalt (1:522)
 3. Saxony (1:624)
 4. Bremen (1:1,058)
 5. Thuringia (1:1,132)
 6. Lower Saxony (1:1,241)
 7. Hamburg (1:1,465)
 8. Mecklenburg-Vorpommern (1:1,689)
 9. Berlin (1:1,708)

People
 Alfonso Thiele (1922–1986), American Italian racing driver
 Allen Thiele (1940–2017), Master Chief Petty Officer of the Coast Guard
 Annekatrin Thiele (born 1984), German rower
 August Thiele (1894–1967), Vizeadmiral with the Kriegsmarine
 Aurelie Thiele, French professor using optimization algorithms to control costs in the healthcare industry
 Bob Thiele (1922–1996), producer and record executive, who co-composed "What a Wonderful World", and discovered Buddy Holly and the Crickets
 Bob Thiele Jr. (born 1955), American musician and music producer, son of Bob
Carol J. Thiele, American microbiologist and cancer researcher 
 Charles Thiele (1884–1954), American-Canadian bandmaster, musician and industrialist
 Colin Thiele (1920–2006), Australian writer of popular children's stories, including Storm Boy
 Dave Thiele (born circa 1952), Canadian politician
 Edwin R. Thiele (1895–1986), missionary and archaeologist, best known for his Old Testament chronology
 Ernest Thiele (1895–1993), influential chemical engineer
 Fred W. Thiele Jr. (born 1953), American politician
 Fritz Thiele (1894–1944), German member of the 20 July conspiracy to kill Hitler
 Gerhard Thiele (born 1953), ESA astronaut and geophysicist, who was on the Shuttle Radar Topography Mission in February 2000
 Georg Thiele (1881–1914), Imperial German Navy officer
 Hans Thiele, Filipino professional basketball player
 Heinz Hermann Thiele (1941–2021), German businessman and chairman of Knorr-Bremse
 Hertha Thiele, German actress
 Holger Thiele (1878–1946), Danish-American astronomer
 Ilse Thiele (1920–2010), East German politician
 Jacob Thiele, musician for the rock group The Faint
 Johan Rudolph Thiele (1736–1815), Danish book printer
 Johannes Thiele (1860–1935), German zoologist, and curator of the Museum of Natural History in Berlin
 Johannes Thiele (chemist) (1865–1918), chemist at the university of Munich
 Jürgen Thiele (born 1959), German rower
 Just Mathias Thiele (1795–1874), Danish writer and art historian
 Keith Thiele (1921–2016), New Zealand World War II pilot
 Kevin Thiele (born 1959), Australian botanist and taxonomist
 Klaus Thiele (born 1958), German athlete
 Leslie Thiele, American political scientist
 Neville Thiele, Australian Engineer, known for having simplified and made into practical approach the algorithms for calculating loudspeaker cabinets similarly as Richard H. Small (thus Thiele/Small loudspeaker parameters)
 Ria Thiele (1904–1996), German actress, dancer and choreographer
 Rolf Thiele (1918–1994), German film director
 Rüdiger Thiele (born 1943), German mathematician and historian of mathematics
 Thorvald N. Thiele (1838–1910), Danish astronomer, mathematician, and statistician, one of the founders of the insurance company Hafnia
 Timmy Thiele (born 1991), German footballer
 Walter Thiele (born 1921), German inventor
 Walter G. Thiele (1885–1968), associate Justice of the Kansas Supreme Court
 Wilhelm Thiele (1890–1975), Austrian screenwriter and film director

Other uses
 Thiele (Aar), a river of Hesse, Germany, tributary of the Aar
 Thiele modulus, in Chemistry
 Thiele tube, laboratory glassware
 German destroyer Z2 Georg Thiele, built for the German Navy during the mid-1930s
 1586 Thiele, a minor planet

See also

 Thiele or Thièle Fheel: a river in Switzerland: see Thielle and its upstream name  Orbe
 Thiel (disambiguation)
 Tiele (disambiguation)
 Teale

References

German-language surnames